Area codes in Malaysia, usually referred to as postcodes (Malay: poskod), are five digit numeric.

The first two digits of the postcode denote (KEMAMAN,TERENGGANU). However, postcode area boundaries may cross state borders, as areas near to state borders may be served by post offices located in another state, and therefore use postcodes of the assigned post offices.

History
Malaysia's current postcode system was initiated by M. Rajasingam, director-general of Pos Malaysia from 1976 to 1986. In 1976, only addresses in Kuala Lumpur had postcodes. Wanting to expand the postcode system to the whole country, Rajasingam enlisted the help of the French postal authorities. The postcode system made the process of sorting out mail smoother, as it was easier for machines to recognise the numbers. In 2014, Rajasingam was honoured with the Darjah Panglima Jasa Negara (PJN), which carries the title of "Datuk", for his contributions to the postal service.

Areas

Listed below are the first 2 digits of codes assigned to each state and federal territory. The state capital for each state is indicated in brackets.

Federal Territories
 Kuala Lumpur uses codes from 50000 to 60000 (Including a few areas such as Cheras, Taman Melawati, Bukit Lanjan, Bandar Sri Damansara, Pandan Indah which are actually in Selangor), and 68100 (Taman Wahyu and Kuala Lumpur Wholesale Market under the Kuala Lumpur jurisdiction) 
 Putrajaya uses codes from 62300 to 62988
 Labuan uses codes from 87xxx to 87033

States
 Selangor (Shah Alam) uses codes from 40xxx to 48300, 63xxx to 68100
 Terengganu (Kuala Terengganu) uses codes from 20xxx to 24300
 Sarawak (Kuching) uses codes from 93xxx to 98859
 Sabah (Kota Kinabalu) uses codes from 88xxx to 91309 (Including Layang-Layang Island)
 Kedah (Alor Setar) uses codes from 05xxx to 09810
 Kelantan (Kota Bharu) uses codes from 15xxx to 18500
 Negeri Sembilan (Seremban) uses codes from 70xxx to 73509
 Pulau Pinang (George Town) uses codes from 10xxx to 14400
 Johor (Johor Bahru) uses codes from 79xxx to 86900
 Melaka (Melaka) uses codes from 75xxx to 78309
 Perlis (Kangar) uses codes from 01xxx to 02xxx
 Perak (Ipoh) uses codes from 30xxx to 36810
 Pahang (Kuantan) uses codes from 25xxx to 28800, 390xx to 39200 for Cameron Highlands, 49000 for Fraser's Hill  and 69000 for Genting Highlands, 28xxx to 28350 for Temerloh district

Notable postcodes

See also 
 Addresses in Malaysia

References

External links
 Pos Malaysia
 Poskod Malaysia
 Pos Malaysia Official Website's Postcode Finder

Malaysia
Postal codes
Postal system of Malaysia